Gaishorn am See is a municipality in the district of Liezen in the Austrian state of Styria.

Geography
Gaishorn lies in the Palten valley surrounded by the Ennstal Alps on the north, the Eisenerz Alps on the east, and the Seckau Alps and the Rottenmanner Tauern on the west. It is on the old Salzstraße from Selzthal to Sankt Michael in Obersteiermark over the Schober Pass.

References

Cities and towns in Liezen District